Ivor Grenville Theophulus Bird is an Antiguan businessman and the son of Vere Bird, former Prime Minister of Antigua and Barbuda.

The director of ZDK, Antigua's government broadcasting system, Bird was caught smuggling 10 kg of cocaine through V. C. Bird International Airport with an accomplice, Marcus Alberto Chapman. He was formally charged with possession of cocaine with the intent to both sell and transfer by Judge Mario Ducillo, and released on 50,000 East Caribbean dollars bail. Having plead not guilty, he was represented by John Platts-Mills, Steadroy Benjamin and David Toms, Jr.; despite this representation, he was convicted on 15 May 1995 following 45 minutes of deliberations. He was ordered to either pay a fine of 200,000 dollars or face two years in jail, and paid the fine shortly before the court closed;
he continued to serve as head of ZDK,

Earlier in his life he was a high jumper and he was the last gold medallist in that event at the British West Indies Championships in 1965. His brother, Lester Bird, was also a track athlete and former champion at this competition. Ivor Bird also represented Antigua and Barbuda in high jump at the 1966 British Empire and Commonwealth Games.

References

Living people
Antigua and Barbuda businesspeople
Antigua and Barbuda drug traffickers
Ivor
Children of national leaders
Antigua and Barbuda male high jumpers
Commonwealth Games competitors for Antigua and Barbuda
Athletes (track and field) at the 1966 British Empire and Commonwealth Games
Year of birth missing (living people)